Hoed may refer to:

De Hoed, a historic Dutch windmill
Pat Hoed (born 1963), an American singer and radio personality